The women's shot put at the 2018 Commonwealth Games, as part of the athletics programme, took place in the Carrara Stadium on 12 and 13 April 2018.

Records
Prior to this competition, the existing world and Games records were as follows:

Schedule
The schedule was as follows:

All times are Australian Eastern Standard Time (UTC+10)

Results

Qualifying round
Across two groups, those who threw ≥16.50 m (Q) or at least the 12 best performers (q) advanced to the final.

Final
The medals were determined in the final.

References

Women's shot put
2018
2018 in women's athletics